Potter's Electric News (published by Joseph Potter) was a weekly English language newspaper distributed in districts of South Wales (Haverfordwest, Fishguard, Begelly, Milford Haven and Tenby). It contained local, national and international news, and information. It was a very popular paper for a time, and at its peak had a weekly circulation of 2,000. Associated titles: Pembrokeshire Herald and General Advertiser.

References

Newspapers published in Wales